The 2022 Open Harmonie mutuelle was a professional tennis tournament played on hard courts. It was the seventeenth edition of the tournament which was part of the 2022 ATP Challenger Tour. It took place in Saint-Brieuc, France between 28 March and 4 April 2022.

Singles main-draw entrants

Seeds

 Rankings are as of 21 March 2022.

Other entrants
The following players received wildcards into the singles main draw:
  Arthur Fils
  Harold Mayot
  Luca Van Assche

The following players received entry into the singles main draw as alternates:
  Malek Jaziri
  Mikael Torpegaard

The following players received entry from the qualifying draw:
  Zizou Bergs
  Alexis Galarneau
  Alastair Gray
  Fábián Marozsán
  Marvin Möller
  Henri Squire

The following players received entry as lucky losers:
  Benjamin Hassan
  Michail Pervolarakis
  Mats Rosenkranz

Champions

Singles

 Jack Draper def.  Zizou Bergs 6–2, 5–7, 6–4.

Doubles

 Sander Arends /  David Pel def.  Jonathan Eysseric /  Robin Haase 6–3, 6–3.

References

2022 ATP Challenger Tour
2022
2022 in French tennis
March 2022 sports events in France
April 2022 sports events in France